The women's long jump event at the 2017 European Athletics Indoor Championships was held on 4 March 2015 at 12:00 (qualification) and 5 March, 17:40 (final) local time.

Medalists

Records

Results

Qualification 
Qualification: Qualifying performance 6.60 (Q) or at least 8 best performers (q) advance to the Final.

Final

References 

2017 European Athletics Indoor Championships
Long jump at the European Athletics Indoor Championships